Bakerman is a feature film written and directed by David Noel Bourke. It stars Mikkel Vadsholt, Siir Tilif, Brian Hjulmann and Mia Lerdam. The movie evolved from a previous project, White Pig, whose scope was too large to shoot independently, so the filmmaker took one character and developed a movie about him. Mikkel Vadsholt's portrayal of the Bakerman character won the 2017 Best Male Actor Award at the Nordic International Film Festival in New York.

Plot
"A Nordic FALLING DOWN, Jens (Mikkel Vadsholdt) has accepted far too much for too long. Being the shy night-owl he is, he keeps to himself, but the world will not let him be. The new master baker's quality starts slackening, and when a bunch of yobs one day smash the window of Jens's car, he takes one of them out. Intoxicated by his own new unexpressed vigour, Jens comes out of his shell, but the destructive driving force leads him towards a free fall. A film that is as shocking with its vigilante story as it is captivating with its determination. Headed by Mikkel Vadsholdt, who here manages to arouse our empathy in a role of a reserved man who has difficulty coping with the light of day."

The film's tagline is "Man shall not live by bread alone..."

Film festivals and awards

Bakerman had its world premier at Denmark's biggest film festival, CPH:PIX. The official Irish premier was the Dingle International Film Festival (Dingle IFF) 2017, where the director also participated in a special Independent Journey panel to discuss the making of this feature film along with other filmmakers.

Bakerman also was officially selected at Filmfest München 2017, which is the second largest film festival in Germany (after Berlinale); the film participated in the international independents section of the festival program. In addition, the director was part of a special filmmakers panel, entitled Filmmakers Live: Cool Genre Cinema.

Other notable film festivals that invited the film for screenings include Nordic International Film Festival in New York (where the lead actor won the Best Male Actor Award), the Scandinavian International Film Festival in Finland,
 the Richard Harris International Film Festival in Ireland,
 and the Lund International Fantastic Film Festival in Sweden (where it was nominated for the Méliès d'argent award for Best Feature Film).

Won the BEST FOREIGN FILM award at the Maryland International film festival presented to director David Noel Bourke.

References

External links
 Official Site
 
 

2016 films
Danish independent films